Antonio Saverio (25 March 1932 – 8 June 1995) was an Italian rower. He competed in the men's coxless pair event at the 1952 Summer Olympics in Helsinki in Finland.

References

External links
 

1932 births
1995 deaths
Italian male rowers
Olympic rowers of Italy
Rowers at the 1952 Summer Olympics
Sportspeople from Lecco